James Robinson (January 5, 1828April 8, 1878) was an American merchant, Democratic politician, and Wisconsin pioneer.  He was a member of the Wisconsin State Assembly, representing Calumet County in the 1853, 1858, 1863, and 1870 sessions.

Biography
James Robinson was born in New York City in January 1828.  When he was six years old, he moved with his parents to Chester County, Pennsylvania, where he was raised and educated.

At the outbreak of the Mexican–American War, Robinson attempted to enroll with the militia, but was prohibited due to his young age.  As soon as he was able, he enlisted with the regular United States Army, and was enrolled in the 4th U.S. Infantry Regiment, where he was promoted to acting quartermaster sergeant, serving under Ulysses S. Grant, who was then a lieutenant and quartermaster of the regiment.

After the war, Robinson moved to the new state of Wisconsin and settled initially at Green Bay in 1848.  By 1850, he had moved to Calumet County, at the site that would later become Chilton.

Shortly after settling there, Robinson was elected to represent Calumet County in the Wisconsin State Assembly.  During the 1853 session, he helped to secure a charter for Chilton and the status of Chilton as the county seat for Calumet County.  He was subsequently elected to three more terms in the Assembly, serving in 1858, 1863, and 1870.  He was also chosen as a delegate to the 1876 Democratic National Convention.

He briefly enrolled with the Union Army for the American Civil War, and was commissioned first lieutenant of Company K in the 4th Wisconsin Infantry Regiment, but he resigned before the regiment left Wisconsin.

In 1877, he relocated to Colton, California, due to health problems.  He died of Pneumonia in April 1878, after his wife and daughter died of similar symptoms.

Personal life and family
James Robinson married Eleanor Mangan in 1850.  He had at least 9 children.  After his death, five children were still living.

Electoral history

Wisconsin Assembly (1869)

| colspan="6" style="text-align:center;background-color: #e9e9e9;"| General Election, November 2, 1869

References

1828 births
1878 deaths
Politicians from New York City
People from Chester County, Pennsylvania
People from Chilton, Wisconsin
Democratic Party members of the Wisconsin State Assembly
Wisconsin pioneers
United States Army personnel of the Mexican–American War